Onise Saneblidze (born 22 October 1998) is a Georgian judoka. He is the bronze medallist in the -100 kg at the 2021 Judo Grand Slam Paris

References

External links
 

1998 births
Living people
Male judoka from Georgia (country)